Dierdorff Farmstead is a historic home and farm located in Elkhart Township, Elkhart County, Indiana. The house was built in 1892, and is a two-story, frame dwelling with Queen Anne style design elements.  It has a wraparound porch with Eastlake movement details and a patterned slate gable roof.  The property also includes the contributing English barn (c. 1854), summer kitchen (1892), windmill (c. 1892), and poultry shed (c. 1920).

It was added to the National Register of Historic Places in 2011.

References

Farms on the National Register of Historic Places in Indiana
Queen Anne architecture in Indiana
Houses completed in 1892
Houses in Elkhart County, Indiana
National Register of Historic Places in Elkhart County, Indiana